Andrews Ridge is a gentle ridge, being the northern arm of Nussbaum Riegel, which trends eastward to the south of Suess Glacier and Lake Chad in Taylor Valley, Victoria Land. It was named by Griffith Taylor, leader of the Western Journey Party of the British Antarctic Expedition, 1910–13.

References
 

Ridges of Victoria Land
McMurdo Dry Valleys